In molecular biology ctRNA (counter-transcribed RNA) is a plasmid encoded noncoding RNA that binds to the mRNA of repB and causes translational inhibition.
ctRNA is encoded by plasmids and functions in rolling circle replication to maintain a low copy number. In Corynebacterium glutamicum, it achieves this by antisense pairing with the mRNA of RepB, a replication initiation protein.
In Enterococcus faecium the plasmid pJB01 contains three open reading frames, copA, repB, and repC. The pJB01 ctRNA is coded on the opposite strand from the copA/repB intergenic region and partially overlaps an atypical ribosome binding site for repB.

See also
S-element

References

External links
 
 
 
 

Antisense RNA
Genetics techniques